Keisuke Katto (甲藤 啓介) was born November 12, 1983. He is a Japanese former professional baseball pitcher in Japan's Nippon Professional Baseball. He played for the Fukuoka SoftBank Hawks from 2007 to 2012.

External links

NPB stats

1983 births
Living people
Baseball people from Kōchi Prefecture
Japanese baseball players
Nippon Professional Baseball pitchers
Fukuoka SoftBank Hawks players